The Alpha Delta Pi Sorority House is a historic sorority house located at the University of Illinois at Urbana–Champaign in Urbana, Illinois. The house was built in 1926 for the university's Sigma chapter of the Alpha Delta Pi sorority, which was chartered in 1912. The Berwyn architecture firm of William H. Clare and Alban E. Coen designed the house in the French Eclectic style. The style became popular in the 1920s thanks to returning soldiers from World War I and several studies of French cottages. Key features of the style present in the sorority house include its asymmetrical massing, steep slate hip roof with multiple dormers, limestone quoins and string course, bay windows, and arched corner entryway.

The house was added to the National Register of Historic Places on November 8, 2000.

References

Residential buildings on the National Register of Historic Places in Illinois
Houses completed in 1926
National Register of Historic Places in Champaign County, Illinois
Sorority houses
Buildings and structures of the University of Illinois Urbana-Champaign
Buildings and structures in Urbana, Illinois
University of Illinois Urbana-Champaign
History of women in Illinois